The list of the wealthiest of Italy is a list extracted from that published by United States Forbes, which brings together the richest people every year.

2021

2017

2016

2015

2014

2013

2012

2011

2010

2009

2008

2007

2006

2005

2004

References

Economy of Italy-related lists
Italians
Net worth